are Japanese divers famous for collecting pearls, though traditionally their main catch is seafood.

Terminology
There are several sea occupations that are pronounced "ama" and several words that refer to sea occupation.

  – a female sea-diving fisherperson
  – a male sea-diving fisherperson
 ,  – a sea-diving fisherperson of either gender
 uminchu – a sea fisherperson of either gender in Okinawan

While one definition of ama specifically refers to divers, another definition refers to fisherpersons in general.

History
Japanese tradition holds that the practice of  may be 2,000 years old.

Early  were known to dive for seafood and were honored with the task of retrieving abalone for shrines and imperial emperors.  traditionally wear white, as the colour represents purity and also to possibly ward off sharks. Traditionally and even as recently as the 1960s,  dived wearing only a loincloth, but in the 20th century, the divers adopted an all-white sheer diving uniform in order to be more presentable while diving. Even in modern times,  dive without scuba gear or air tanks, making them a traditional sort of free-diver.

Pearl diving  were considered rare in the early years of diving. He established the Mikimoto Pearl Island in Toba and used the 's findings to grow his business internationally. Nowadays, the pearl-diving  are viewed as a tourist attraction at Mikimoto Pearl Island. The number of  continue to dwindle as this ancient technique becomes less and less practiced, due to disinterest in the new generation of women and the dwindling demand for their activity. In the 1940s, 6,000  were reported active along the coasts of Japan, while today  practice at numbers more along the scale of 60 or 70 divers in a generation.

Activities
Despite their early start, divers are known to be active well into their 70s and are rumored to live longer due to their diving training and discipline. In Japan, women were considered to be superior divers due to the distribution of their fat and their ability to hold their breath. The garments of the  have changed throughout time, from the original loincloth to the white sheer garbs and eventually to the modern diving wetsuit.

One traditional article of clothing that has stood the test of time is their headscarves. The  are also known to create small shrines near their diving location where they will visit after diving in order to thank the gods for their safe return.

The  were expected to endure harsh conditions while diving, such as freezing temperatures and great pressures from the depths of the sea. Through the practice, many  were noted to lose weight during the months of diving seasons.  practiced a breathing technique in which the divers would release air in a long whistle once they resurfaced from a dive.

In culture
 James Bond travels to Japan in the novel You Only Live Twice. He meets and becomes involved with  Kissy Suzuki. The character was also portrayed in the film version.
 The NHK morning television drama  centers on a high school girl on the Tohoku region who initially sets out to become an  diver.
 The Dream of the Fisherman's Wife, an 1814 woodblock print by Japanese artist Hokusai, depicts a young  diver entwined sexually with a pair of octopuses.
 Ama Girls, a 1958 documentary film; winner of the Academy Award for Documentary Short Subject.
  is a Japanese manga series, later adapted into an anime. Its name is a longer version of the word , and its subject matter involves female divers.
 , an award-winning 2016 documentary film by Portuguese director Cláudia Varejão, that follows the daily life of three Japanese women who have been diving together, for 30 years, in a small fishing village on the Shima Peninsula.

See also
  – Female occupational divers in the Korean province of Jeju

References

Further reading
 
 Martinez, D. P. (2004). Identity and Ritual in a Japanese Village University of Hawaii Press. 
 Mishima, Yukio (1994). The Sound of Waves. Vintage.

External links

 English: United Nations University (2009) digital video "Where the sea whistle echoes": Ama, legendary women divers of Japan facing climate change and an uncertain future Accessed 1 December 2009
 Ama Cultural Village in Japanese
  at the Rubicon Foundation

Japanese words and phrases
Economy of Japan
Fishing industry in Japan
Society of Japan
Pearls
Underwater occupations